In Ohio, State Route 20 may refer to:
U.S. Route 20 in Ohio, the only Ohio highway numbered 20 since 1927
Ohio State Route 20 (1923-1927), now SR 16 (Columbus to Newcomerstown), CR 21 (Newcomerstown to New Philadelphia), and SR 39 (New Philadelphia to East Liverpool)

20